North Coast Line (NCL) opening dates by sectionQuinlan, H. & Newland, R. 'Australian Railway Routes 1854-2000' ARHS NSW 2000

This is a list of the NCL opening dates in sectional order. This list shows the original opening date of each NCL section, ignoring any subsequent deviations etc. A list of the NCL opening dates by chronological order, including the known opening dates for all line construction, including deviations, plus the known dates of other significant NCL related events is here.

References

North Coast railway line, Queensland